Mahmoud Saad (born 9 January 1958) is a Syrian judoka. He competed in the men's middleweight event at the 1980 Summer Olympics.

References

1958 births
Living people
Syrian male judoka
Olympic judoka of Syria
Judoka at the 1980 Summer Olympics
Place of birth missing (living people)